Hexalectris colemanii, or Coleman's crested coralroot, is a terrestrial, myco-heterotrophic orchid lacking chlorophyll and subsisting entirely on nutrients obtained from mycorrhizal fungi in the soil. It is a very rare species endemic to southern Arizona, known from only three counties (Pima, Cochise and Santa Cruz). It is closely related to H. revoluta and the two are sometimes considered varieties of the same species.

References

External links
Vimeo, Center for Biological Diversity, video showing Hexalectris colemanii in Santa Rita Mountains of Arizona

Bletiinae
Myco-heterotrophic orchids
Orchids of the United States
Flora of Arizona
Endangered flora of the United States
Plants described in 2004
Flora without expected TNC conservation status